A trío romántico  is a group of vocalists-guitarists, with origins in Hispanic America, that performs romantic songs, based on rhythms like bolero, vals and pasillo, mostly. 

The ensemble may be composed of three musicians: first guitar, second guitar and requinto guitar. Sometimes it is accompanied by maracas, or one of the guitars may be replaced by a double bass, guitarron or Mexican vihuela.

Among the renowned artists are Los Tres Caballeros, Los Panchos, Los Tres Ases, Los Tres Reyes, and the singers Eydie Gormé and Lucho Gatica.

References 
bio
 Cien años de boleros por Jaime Rico Salazar.
 Historia del Bolero 

Latin American music